Francis Daniel Pastorius (September 26, 1651) was a German-born educator, lawyer, poet, and public official. He was the founder of Germantown, Pennsylvania, now part of Philadelphia, the first permanent German-American settlement and the gateway for subsequent emigrants from Germany.

Early life
Franz Daniel Pastorius was born in the Franconian town of Sommerhausen, to a prosperous Lutheran family. He received a Gymnasium education in Windsheim (also in Franconia), where his family moved in 1659. He was trained as a lawyer in some of the best German universities of his day, including the University of Altdorf, the University of Strasbourg and the Friedrich Schiller University of Jena. He started his practice in Windsheim and continued it in Frankfurt-am-Main. He was a close friend of the Lutheran theologian and Pietist leader Philipp Jakob Spener during the early development of Spener's movement in Frankfurt. From 1680 to 1682, he worked as a tutor accompanying a young nobleman during his Wanderjahr through Germany, England, France, Switzerland and the Netherlands.
Pastorius' biography reveals increasing dissatisfaction with the Lutheran church and state of his German youth in the Age of Absolutism. As a young adult his Christian morality even strained the relationship with his father Melchior Adam Pastorius (1624–1702), a wealthy lawyer and burgomaster in Windsheim. 
 These difficulties came to a head in 1677–1679, years of tumult in this imperial city. After Pastorius had completed his doctorate in law, returned to Windsheim and begun his law career, his family and friends (with Habsburg backing) suppressed a popular insurrection against abuses of oligarchic rule. It was in this context that he left his home in 1679, joined the Lutheran Pietists in Frankfurt, and repeatedly urged adherence to Christ's Golden Rule. He emigrated to Pennsylvania four years later, and never went back to Windsheim.

To Philadelphia

In 1683, a group of Mennonites, Pietists, and Quakers in Frankfurt, including Abraham op den Graeff a cousin of William Penn, approached Pastorius about acting as their agent to purchase land in Pennsylvania for a settlement. Pastorius took passage, aboard the ship America and arrived in Philadelphia on August 20th, 1683.  In Philadelphia, he negotiated the purchase of 15,000 acres (61 km²) from William Penn, the proprietor of the colony, and laid out the settlement of Germantown, where he himself would live until his death. As one of Germantown's leading citizens, Pastorius served in many public offices.  He was the first mayor and also was a member of the Pennsylvania General Assembly in 1687 and 1691. In 1702, he opened a school in Germantown which enrolled both boys and girls; the suffragist Alice Paul cited his enrollment of girls in her PhD dissertation from the University of Pennsylvania, and noted that his commitment was exceptional in a community that otherwise upheld a "Haus Frau" ideal.

Writings
He wrote extensively on topics ranging from beekeeping to religion. He was "the first poet of consequence in Pennsylvania . . . [and] one of the most important poets of early America" (Meserole, p. 294). His extensive commonplace compilations provide insight into early Enlightenment culture in colonial Pennsylvania.
He was also a skilled poet whose work appears in the New Oxford Book of Seventeenth-Century Verse.  Pastorius' most important book was his manuscript "Bee Hive," which is now in the University of Pennsylvania's rare book room. It is his commonplace book, which contains poetry, his thoughts on religion and politics, and lists of books he consulted along with excerpts from those books. Also of interest is his Geographical Description of Pennsylvania, first published under the title, Umständige geographische Beschreibung der allerletzt erfundenen Provintz Pennsylvania (1700). This book also contains many of his letters home to Germany. His manuscripts include treatises on horticulture, law, agriculture and medicine.
 Penn State University Press published in 2019 a reader on Francis Daniel Pastorius edited by Patrick M. Erben.

Personal
Pastorius married Ennecke Klostermanns (1658–1723) on November 6, 1688. They had two sons: Johann Samuel Pastorius (1690–1722) and Heinrich Pastorius (1692–1726). Though raised as an upper-class Lutheran, he converted to Lutheran Pietism as a young adult in Germany. He grew increasingly liberal in Pennsylvania, espousing universalism and moving close to Quakerism. 

Famed jazz bass guitarist Jaco Pastorius is his distant descendant.

Legacy

Anti-slavery stand
In 1688 he drafted, together with Garret Hendericks, Derick op den Graeff, and Abraham op den Graeff the first protest against slavery in America. Pastorius was a cosigner of the 1688 Germantown Quaker Petition Against Slavery, the first petition against slavery made in the Thirteen Colonies. Before the American Civil War, when abolition of slavery was gaining strength, Pastorius was ripe for celebration.  The Quaker poet John Greenleaf Whittier celebrated Pastorius' lifeand particularly his anti-slavery advocacyin  Whittier also translated the Latin ode addressed to posterity, which Pastorius prefixed to his Germantown book of records.

Operation Pastorius
Despite the Quaker sympathies of Pastorius, his name was appropriated in 1942 by the Abwehr of Nazi Germany for "Operation Pastorius," a failed sabotage attack on the United States during World War II that included a target in Philadelphia.

Biographies
For generations Pastorius has won the affections of historians. In the early twentieth century, German-American scholars embraced him and the University of Pennsylvania professor Marion Dexter Learned (1857–1917) wrote a lengthy biography; Learned had access to papers that have subsequently been lost. In 1953 DeElla Victoria Toms wrote a Ph.D. dissertation on intellectual and literary of Francis Daniel Pastorius.

In 1985 John Weaver documented the cultural background of Pastorius' childhood and youth, and his reasons for emigrating to Pennsylvania in 1683.
More recently Princeton University professor Anthony Grafton has written about Pastorius as a representative of European intellectual culture. Grafton's presidential address to the American Historical Association in 2012 was on Pastorius. Weaver extensively revised his earlier research in a book (in PDF) available online and published in 2016. In 2012 Patrick Erben wrote A Harmony of the Spirits: Translation and the Language of Community in Early Pennsylvania.  In 2017 Margo Lambert published "Mediation, Assimilation, and German Foundations in North America: Francis Daniel Pastorius as Cultural Broker."

Legacy

 The Pastorius Home Association, Inc. operates the Pastorius Haus in Bad Windsheim, Germany and the Pastorius House in Germansville, Pennsylvania.
 The Pastorius Monument is located in Vernon Park in Northwest Philadelphia, PA.
Pastorius Park is located in the Chestnut Hill section of Philadelphia, PA.

References

Other sources
 Bowden, Henry Warner (1977) Dictionary of American Religious Biography  (Westport, CT:Greenwood Press)  
 Brophy, Alfred L.  "Ingenium est Fateri per quos profeceris: Francis Daniel Pastorius' Young Country Clerk's Collection and Anglo-American Legal Literature, 1682–1716," University of Chicago Law School Roundtable (1996) volume 3: 627–721.
 Dünnhaupt, Gerhard, "F. D. Pastorius" (Biography and Bibliography)  in: Personalbibliographien zu den Drucken des Barock", vol. 4, (Stuttgart: Hiersemann, 1991, pp. 3075–3079) 
 Genzmer, George Harvey "Pastorius, Francis Daniel," in Dumas Malone (ed.), Dictionary of American Biography, Vol. 7, Part 2, (New York: Charles Scribner's Sons, 1934 (1962 reprint), pp. 290–291)
 Gross, Leonard; Gleysteen, Jan  (2007) Colonial Germantown Mennonites (Telford, PA: Cascadia)  
 Meserole, Harrison T. (ed) "Seventeenth-Century American Poetry," Anchor Seventeenth-Century Series. (Garden City, N.Y.: Doubleday, 1968, pp. 293–304) 

Writings by Pastorius
 Deliciæ Hortenses, or Garden-Recreations, and Voluptates Apianæ, ed. Christoph E. Schweitzer (Columbia, South Carolina: Camden House, 1982).
 Francis Daniel Pastorius Reader: Writings by an Early American Polymath'', ed. Patrick Erben (University Press: Penn State Press, 2019).
 Marion Dexter Learned, “From Pastorius’ Bee-Hive or Bee-Stock,” Americana Germanica 1, no. 4 (1879): 67-110.

External links

 Francis Daniel Pastorius Describes his impressions of Pennsylvania, 1683
 Full text of Learned, Marion Dexter, The Life of Francis Daniel Pastorius, the Founder of Germantown, Campbell: Philadelphia, 1908, x, 324p.
 Article containing text of letter protesting slavery signed by Pastorius and three others.
 Quaker Protest Against Slavery in the New World, Germantown (Pa.) 1688.
 Philadelphia Public Art: Pastorius Monument
 The Francis Daniel Pastorius papers, which include his personal papers and writings, are available for research use at the Historical Society of Pennsylvania.

1651 births
1720 deaths
Educators from Philadelphia
Politicians from Philadelphia
People of colonial Pennsylvania
People from Würzburg (district)
Poets from Pennsylvania
University of Altdorf alumni
University of Jena alumni
University of Strasbourg alumni
German emigrants to the Thirteen Colonies
American abolitionists
American Quakers
Members of the Pennsylvania Provincial Assembly
People from Philadelphia
Quaker abolitionists